The Bonbonnière egg is one of the Fabergé eggs created in the workshop of Peter Carl Fabergé for the wealthy Russian industrialist Alexander Kelch who presented it to his wife as an Easter gift in 1903.  Because it was not a gift from a Russian tsar to his tsarina, it is not considered an "imperial" Fabergé egg but rather, in this instance, is called one of the seven "Kelch" eggs.  It is the sixth egg in this series.  A bonbonnière is a candy box (lit. a bearer of bonbons) in French.

It is made of gold, diamonds, chalcedony, pearls, transparent white enamel, a velvet. The miniature box "surprise" inside the main box/ egg is made of agate and has been decorated with brilliant cut stones and a cabochon ruby. Inside this there is a pendant of gold and enamel.

See also
 Objet d'art

References

External links
Description at wintraecken.nl

Kelch Fabergé eggs
1903 works